Huddersfield Town's 1967–68 campaign was a mainly mediocre season for the Town. Town finished the season in the mid-table position of 14th under Tom Johnston. This season is most remembered by Town fans for their best ever run in the Football League Cup. They reached the semi-finals, before losing to 1st Division Arsenal 6–3 on aggregate.

Squad at the start of the season

Review
Tom Johnston was beginning his 3rd full season in charge of the Terriers following a pretty impressive previous season, many were hoping that Town could possibly push for a promotion back to Division 1. After winning the first 2 games against Bristol City and Millwall, Town failed to win the next 7 games in the league and Town's league form never seemed to truly recover during the season.

Their Football League Cup campaign during the season is currently the best in Town's history. Following wins in the earlier rounds against Wolverhampton Wanderers, Norwich City, West Ham United and Fulham, Town played 1st Division Arsenal in the semi-finals of the competition. Following a narrow 3-2 defeat at Highbury in the first leg, some were thinking that a trip to Wembley wasn't out of the question. Tony Leighton gave Town an early lead in the second leg at Leeds Road, but the Gunners scored 3 further goals to secure their final berth at Town's expense. Town finished their league campaign in 14th place with only 38 points.

Squad at the end of the season

Results

Division Two

FA Cup

Football League Cup

Appearances and goals

Huddersfield Town A.F.C. seasons
Huddersfield Town